Robert Hodgson  (9 October 1844) was Dean of Carlisle from 1820 to 1844.

Life 
He was born to Robert Hodgson, of Congleton, and Mildred (née Porteus) in early 1773. He was baptised on 22 September 1773 at St Peter's Church, Congleton. Hodgson was a close relative (by marriage on his father's side and by blood on his mother's side) of Beilby Porteus, Bishop of London, whom he wrote a biography about.

On his mother's side, he was a descendant of Augustine Warner Jr., who presided as the Speaker of the Virginia House of Burgesses during Bacon's Rebellion (Warner served before the Rebellion in 1676, and after the Rebellion in 1677.)

Hodgson was educated at Macclesfield School and Peterhouse, Cambridge, where he graduated BA as 14th Wrangler in 1795. He was rector of St George's, Hanover Square for over forty years, from 1803 until his death in 1844.

Family
Hodgson married Mary Tucker on 23 February 1804. Their son, George Henry Hodgson, was a Lieutenant aboard on the ill-fated Franklin Expedition. Their daughter Henrietta Mildred Hodgson was a great-grandmother of Queen Elizabeth the Queen Mother.

References

Alumni of Peterhouse, Cambridge
Fellows of the Royal Society
Archdeacons of St Albans
Deans of Chester
Deans of Carlisle
1844 deaths
1773 births